Myerson is a surname. Notable people with the surname include:

Abraham Myerson (1881–1948), American neurologist, psychiatrist, clinician, pathologist, and researcher
Adam Myerson (born 1972), American professional bicycle racer
Bess Myerson (1924–2014), former Miss America and TV personality, only Jewish Miss America
Jonathan Myerson (born 1960), British dramatist, writing principally for television and radio, spouse of Julie Myerson
Julie Myerson (born 1960), English author and critic, spouse of Jonathan Myerson
Roger Myerson (born 1951), American economist and Nobel prize winner 2007
Terry Myerson (born 1972 or 1973), software engineer, Microsoft Execeutive Vice President

See also
Meyerson
Myerson's sign, an early symptom of Parkinson's disease
Myerson–Satterthwaite theorem, in mechanism design and the economics of asymmetric information

Jewish surnames
Yiddish-language surnames